Wollemi College is an independent Roman Catholic school for boys, located in the western Sydney suburb of , New South Wales, Australia. Oversight of the college is administered by Parents for Education Foundation (PARED).

Overview 
The school grew out of Orchard Hills Kindergarten School, which was founded in 2000 by a group of parents and teachers, the PARED Foundation. The Orchard Hills Preparatory School has developed into Montgrove College for girls with boys in the infant years. Wollemi College began operating as a school for boys in 2004. Montgrove College in Orchard Hills is the sister school of Wollemi College and the cousin school of Redfield College and Tangara College. A community has been created through PARED, and we will hopefully see more PARED schools in the future.

Wollemi College states that its aim is "to follow the principle that parents are the primary educators of their children and that schools exist to give parents every support". To put it simply Wollemi College states that it aims to provide unity between the home and school. To achieve this aim the school has implemented a number of formal processes into the academic curriculum which include a three way tutorial system between parents, staff and students. There are also a number of activities and programs throughout the school year for parents that are designed to assist parents to be more effective in working with the school to improve their children's academic success and overall character, as they grow, as well as encouraging parents to consider and develop their relationship with their child.

There is also a more informal emphasis by staff on the development of character and virtues in its students, by encouraging staff to provide a good example and by emphasising and encouraging character development amongst the students, as well as encouraging staff and student peers to be fully positive and supportive of parents. Wollemi College aims to focus on character development and nurturing good habits in areas such as "sound judgement, self-control, courage and responsibility towards others, students are better able to use their freedom to make the right choices in life".
 
Wollemi College aims to provide an education that is personal by providing a personal mentor, or tutor, selected from the teaching staff of the school. The aim of that tutor is to provide a constant source of support for the student through his attention, friendship, example and advice. The tutor meets regularly with the student during the term, and meets with his parents at least once each term, reviewing the progress of that student, and helping with goal setting. It is the intention of Wollemi College that the tutor takes a personal interest in the progress of the boys whom he tutors, acting on the parents’ behalf, and coordinating the services of the college for the family. The college also aims to reinforce parental values by providing a positive peer environment within the college.

Enrolment

Religious education 
Religious education is grounded in the teachings of the Catholic faith. Students are encouraged to practice their faith with freedom and conviction. The chaplain of the school is a priest of Opus Dei, a personal prelature of the Catholic Church.

Computer facilities 
Computing studies are incorporated into teaching programs across the disciplines. Student use of computer labs, advanced workstations, and iPads, moves from basic keyboard skills and research through to internet, communications, word processing, database, and music applications to programming, CAD, and web design.

Extracurricular activities 
Co-curricular activities for all students include the Character education Program, fencing, bowling, polo, stream watching, preventative of ISDA debating and public speaking (in the CSSA competitions), study skills workshops, leadership education, class camps, visits by guest speakers and media workshops. Optional activities include father and son camps, chess club and choir.

Sports 
Principal sports include rugby, cricket, soccer, basketball, swimming and athletics. The school is a member of the HZSA (Hills Zone Sports Association), AICES and IPSHAA (Independent Primary School Heads Association of Australia). Students also play club competitions with the Wollemi Soccer Club and the Wollemi Wizards in basketball.

See also

 List of Catholic schools in New South Wales
 Catholic education in Australia

References

External links

Wollemi's Enrolments page

Roman Catholic Diocese of Parramatta
Catholic secondary schools in Sydney
Educational institutions established in 1999
1999 establishments in Australia
Werrington, New South Wales